Mental calculation consists of arithmetical calculations using only the human brain, with no help from any supplies (such as pencil and paper) or devices such as a calculator. People may use mental calculation when computing tools are not available, when it is faster than other means of calculation (such as conventional educational institution methods), or even in a competitive context. Mental calculation often involves the use of specific techniques devised for specific types of problems. People with unusually high ability to perform mental calculations are called mental calculators or lightning calculators.

Many of these techniques take advantage of or rely on the decimal numeral system. Usually, the choice of radix is what determines which method or methods to use.

Methods and techniques

Casting out nines

After applying an arithmetic operation to two operands and getting a result, the following procedure can be used to improve confidence in the correctness of result:
 Sum the digits of the first operand; any 9s (or sets of digits that add to 9) can be counted as 0.
 If the resulting sum has two or more digits, sum those digits as in step one; repeat this step until the resulting sum has only one digit.
 Repeat steps one and two with the second operand. There are two single-digit numbers, one condensed from the first operand and the other condensed from the second operand. (These single-digit numbers are also the remainders one would end up with if one divided the original operands by 9; mathematically speaking, they are the original operands modulo 9.)
 Apply the originally specified operation to the two condensed operands, and then apply the summing-of-digits procedure to the result of the operation.
 Sum the digits of the result that were originally obtained for the original calculation.
 If the result of step 4 does not equal the result of step 5, then the original answer is wrong. If the two results match, then the original answer may be right, though it is not guaranteed to be.
Example
 Say that calculation results that 6338 × 79 equals 500702
 Sum the digits of 6338: (6 + 3 = 9, so count that as 0) + 3 + 8 = 11
 Iterate as needed: 1 + 1 = 2
 Sum the digits of 79: 7 + (9 counted as 0) = 7
 Perform the original operation on the condensed operands, and sum digits: 2 × 7 = 14; 1 + 4 = 5
 Sum the digits of 500702: 5 + 0 + 0 + (7 + 0 + 2 = 9, which counts as 0) = 5
 5 = 5, so there is a good chance that the prediction that 6338 × 79 equals 500702 is right.

The same procedure can be used with multiple operations,  repeating steps 1 and 2 for each operation.

Factors 
When multiplying, a useful thing to remember is that the factors of the operands still remain. For example, to say that 14 × 15 was 201 would be unreasonable. Since 15 is a multiple of 5, the product should be as well. Likewise, 14 is a multiple of 2, so the product should be even. Furthermore, any number which is a multiple of both 5 and 2 is necessarily a multiple of 10, and in the decimal system would end with a 0. The correct answer is 210. It is a multiple of 10, 7 (the other prime factor of 14) and 3 (the other prime factor of 15).

Calculating differences: a − b

Direct calculation 
When the digits of b are all smaller than the corresponding digits of a, the calculation can be done digit by digit. For example, evaluate 872 − 41 simply by subtracting 1 from 2 in the units place, and 4 from 7 in the tens place: 831.

Indirect calculation 
When the above situation does not apply, there is another method known as indirect calculation.

Look-ahead borrow method 
This method can be used to subtract numbers left to right, and if all that is required is to read the result aloud, it requires little of the user's memory even to subtract numbers of arbitrary size.

One place at a time is handled, left to right.

 Example:
 
           4075
         − 1844
         ------
 
 Thousands: 4 − 1 = 3, look to right, 075 < 844, need to borrow.
            3 − 1 = 2, say "Two thousand".
            One is performing 3 - 1 rather than 4 - 1 because the column to the right is
            going to borrow from the thousands place.
 
 Hundreds: 0 − 8 = negative numbers not allowed here.
           One is going to increase this place by using the number one borrowed from the
           column to the left. Therefore:
           10 − 8 = 2. It's 10 rather than 0, because one borrowed from the Thousands
           place. 75 > 44 so no need to borrow,
           say "two hundred"
 
 Tens: 7 − 4 = 3, 5 > 4, so 5 - 4 = 1
Hence, the result is 2231.

Calculating products: a × b 

Many of these methods work because of the distributive property.

Multiplying any two numbers by attaching, subtracting, and routing 
Discovered by Artem Cheprasov, there is a method of multiplication that allows the user to utilize 3 steps to quickly multiply numbers of any size to one another via three unique ways.

First, the method allows the user to attach numbers
to one another, as opposed to adding or subtracting them, during intermediate steps in
order to quicken the rate of multiplication.  For instance, instead of adding or subtracting intermediary results such as 357 and 84, the user
could simply attach the numbers together (35784) in order to simplify and
expedite the multiplication problem.  Attaching numbers to one another helps to bypass unnecessary steps found in traditional multiplication techniques.

Secondly, this method uses negative numbers as necessary, even
when multiplying two positive integers, in order to quicken the rate of multiplication via subtraction.  This means two positive integers can be multiplied together to get negative intermediate steps, yet still the correct positive answer in the end.  These negative numbers are actually automatically derived
from the multiplication steps themselves and are thus unique to a particular
problem.  Again, such negative intermediate steps are designed to help hasten the mental math.

Finally, another unique aspect of using this method is that the
user is able to choose one of several different “routes of multiplication” to
the specific multiplication problem at hand based on their subjective preferences or strengths and weaknesses with particular integers.

Despite the same starting integers, the different multiplication
routes give off different intermediate numbers that are automatically derived for
the user as they multiply.  Some of these
intermediaries may be easier than others (e.g. some users may find a route that uses a negative 7, while another route uses a 5 or a 0, which are typically easier to work with
mentally for most people, but not in all instances).

If one “route” seems to be harder for one student vs. another route and its intermediate numbers, that student can simply choose another simpler route of multiplication for themselves even though it's the
same original problem.

The "Ends of Five" Formula 
For any 2-digit by 2-digit multiplication problem, if both numbers end in five, the following algorithm can be used to quickly multiply them together:

As a preliminary step simply round the smaller number down and the larger up to the nearest multiple of ten.  In this case:

The algorithm reads as follows:

Where t1 is the tens unit of the original larger number (75) and t2 is the tens unit of the original smaller number (35).

The author also outlines another similar algorithm if one wants to round the original larger number down and the original smaller number up instead.

The "Borrower's" Formula 
If two numbers are equidistant from the nearest multiple of 100, then a simple algorithm can be used to find the product.

As a simple example:

Both numbers are equidistant (33 away) from their nearest multiple of 100 (0 and 100, respectively).

As a preliminary step simply round the smaller number down and the larger up to the nearest multiple of ten.  In this case:

The algorithm reads as follows:

Where u1 is the original larger number's (67) units digit and u2 is the original smaller number's (33) units digit.  T1 is the original larger number's tens digit and T2 is the original larger number's tens digit multiplied by their respective power (in this case by 10, for a tens digit).

And so:

Multiplying any 2-digit numbers 
To easily multiply any 2-digit numbers together a simple algorithm is as follows (where a is the tens digit of the first number, b is the ones digit of the first number, c is the tens digit of the second number and d is the ones digit of the second number):

For example,

   800
  +120
  +140
  + 21
 -----
  1081

Note that this is the same thing as the conventional sum of partial products, just restated with brevity. To minimize the number of elements being retained in one's memory, it may be convenient to perform the sum of the "cross" multiplication product first, and then add the other two elements:

 [of which only the tens digit will interfere with the first term]

i.e., in this example
(12 + 14) = 26, 26 × 10 = 260,
to which is it is easy to add 21: 281 and then 800: 1081

An easy mnemonic to remember for this would be FOIL. F meaning first, O meaning outer, I meaning inner and L meaning last. For example:

 

and

 

where 7 is a, 5 is b, 2 is c and 3 is d.

Consider

 

this expression is analogous to any number in base 10 with a hundreds, tens and ones place. FOIL can also be looked at as a number with F being the hundreds, OI being the tens and L being the ones.

 is the product of the first digit of each of the two numbers; F.

 is the addition of the product of the outer digits and the inner digits; OI.

 is the product of the last digit of each of the two numbers; L.

Multiplying by 2 or other small numbers 
Where one number being multiplied is sufficiently small to be multiplied with ease by any single digit, the product can be calculated easily digit by digit from right to left. This is particularly easy for multiplication by 2 since the carry digit cannot be more than 1.

For example, to calculate 2 × 167:
2×7=14, so the final digit is 4, with a 1 carried and added to the 2×6 = 12 to give 13, so the next digit is 3 with a 1 carried and added to the 2×1=2 to give 3. Thus, the product is 334.

Multiplying by 5 
To multiply a number by 5,

1. First multiply that number by 10, then divide it by 2. The two steps are interchangeable i.e. one can halve the number and then multiply it.

The following algorithm is a quick way to produce this result:

2. Add a zero to right side of the desired number. (A.)
3. Next, starting from the leftmost numeral, divide by 2 (B.)
and append each result in the respective order to form a new number;(fraction answers should be rounded down to the nearest whole number).

 EXAMPLE: Multiply 176 by 5.
      A. Add a zero to 176 to make 1760.
      B. Divide by 2 starting at the left.
            1. Divide 1 by 2 to get .5, rounded down to zero.
            2. Divide 7 by 2 to get 3.5, rounded down to 3.
            3. Divide 6 by 2 to get 3. Zero divided by two is simply zero.
The resulting number is 0330. (This is not the final answer, but a first approximation which will be adjusted in the following step:)
      C. Add 5 to the number that follows any single numeral
         in this new number that was odd before dividing by two;

EXAMPLE: 176 (IN FIRST, SECOND, THIRD PLACES):
           
            1.The FIRST place is 1, which is odd. ADD 5 to the numeral after
              the first place in the new number (0330) which is 3; 3+5=8.
          
            2.The number in the second place of 176, 7, is also odd. The
              corresponding number (0 8 3 0) is increased by 5 as well;
              3+5=8.
 
            3.The numeral in the third place of 176, 6, is even, therefore
              the final number, zero, in the answer is not changed. That
              final answer is 0880.
              The leftmost zero can be omitted, leaving 880.
              So 176 times 5 equals 880.
EXAMPLE: Multiply 288 by 5.

A. Divide 288 by 2. One can divide each digit individually to get 144. (Dividing smaller number is easier.)

B. Multiply by 10. Add a zero to yield the result 1440.

Multiplying by 9 
Since 9 = 10 − 1, to multiply a number by nine, multiply it by 10 and then subtract the original number from the result. For example, 9 × 27 = 270 − 27 = 243.

This method can be adjusted to multiply by eight instead of nine, by doubling the number being subtracted; 8 × 27 = 270 − (2×27) = 270 − 54 = 216.

Similarly, by adding instead of subtracting, the same methods can be used to multiply by 11 and 12, respectively (although simpler methods to multiply by 11 exist).

Using hands: 1–10 multiplied by 9 

To use this method, one must place their hands in front of them, palms facing towards them. Assign the left thumb to be 1, the left index to be 2, and so on all the way to the right thumb is ten. Each "|" symbolizes a raised finger and a "−" represents a bent finger.

 1 2 3 4 5  6 7 8 9 10
 | | | | |  | | | | |
 left hand  right hand

Bend the finger which represents the number to be multiplied by nine down.

Ex: 6 × 9 would be

 | | | | |  − | | | |

The right little finger is down. Take the number of fingers still raised to the left of the bent finger and prepend it to the number of fingers to the right.

Ex: There are five fingers left of the right little finger and four to the right of the right little finger. So 6 × 9 = 54.

     5           4
 | | | | |  − | | | |

Multiplying by 10 (and powers of ten) 
To multiply an integer by 10, simply add an extra 0 to the end of the number. To multiply a non-integer by 10, move the decimal point to the right one digit.

In general for base ten, to multiply by 10n (where n is an integer), move the decimal point n digits to the right. If n is negative, move the decimal |n| digits to the left.

Multiplying by 11 
For single digit numbers simply duplicate the number into the tens digit, for example: 1 × 11 = 11, 2 × 11 = 22, up to 9 × 11 = 99.

The product for any larger non-zero integer can be found by a series of additions to each of its digits from right to left, two at a time.

First take the ones digit and copy that to the temporary result. Next, starting with the ones digit of the multiplier, add each digit to the digit to its left. Each sum is then added to the left of the result, in front of all others. If a number sums to 10 or higher take the tens digit, which will always be 1, and carry it over to the next addition. Finally copy the multipliers left-most (highest valued) digit to the front of the result, adding in the carried 1 if necessary, to get the final product.

In the case of a negative 11, multiplier, or both apply the sign to the final product as per normal multiplication of the two numbers.

A step-by-step example of 759 × 11:
 The ones digit of the multiplier, 9, is copied to the temporary result.
 result: 9
 Add 5 + 9 = 14 so 4 is placed on the left side of the result and carry the 1.
 result: 49
 Similarly add 7 + 5 = 12, then add the carried 1 to get 13. Place 3 to the result and carry the 1.
 result: 349
 Add the carried 1 to the highest valued digit in the multiplier, 7 + 1 = 8, and copy to the result to finish.
 Final product of 759 × 11: 8349

Further examples:
 −54 × −11 = 5 5+4(9) 4 = 594
 999 × 11 = 9+1(10) 9+9+1(9) 9+9(8) 9 = 10989
 Note the handling of 9+1 as the highest valued digit.
 −3478 × 11 = 3 3+4+1(8) 4+7+1(2) 7+8(5) 8 = −38258
 62473 × 11 = 6 6+2(8) 2+4+1(7) 4+7+1(2) 7+3(0) 3 = 687203

Another method is to simply multiply the number by 10, and add the original number to the result.

For example:

17 × 11

      17 × 10 = 170
170 + 17 = 187

17 × 11 = 187

One last easy way:

If one has a two-digit number, take it and add the two numbers together and put that sum in the middle, and one can get the answer.

For example: 24 x 11 = 264 because 2 + 4 = 6 and the 6 is placed in between the 2 and the 4.

Second example: 87 x 11 = 957 because 8 + 7 = 15 so the 5 goes in between the 8 and the 7 and the 1 is carried to the 8. So it is basically 857 + 100 = 957.

Or if 43 x 11 is equal to first 4+3=7 (For the tens digit) Then 4 is for the hundreds and 3 is for the tens. And the answer is 473

Multiplying two 2 digit numbers between 11 and 19 
To easily multiply 2 digit numbers together between 11 and 19 a simple algorithm is as follows (where a is the ones digit of the first number and b is the ones digit of the second number):
(10+a)×(10+b)
100 + 10×(a+b) + a×b

which can be visualized as three parts to be added:

1
xx
 yy

for example:

17×16

1               = 100
13    (7+6)     = 10×(a+b)
 42   (7×6)     = a×b
272   (total)

Using hands: 6–10 multiplied by another number 6–10 

This technique allows a number from 6 to 10 to be multiplied by another number from 6 to 10.

Assign 6 to the little finger, 7 to the ring finger, 8 to the middle finger, 9 to the index finger, and 10 to the thumb. Touch the two desired numbers together. The point of contact and below is considered the "bottom" section and everything above the two fingers that are touching are part of the "top" section. The answer is formed by adding ten times the total number of "bottom" fingers to the product of the number of left- and right-hand "top" fingers.

For example, 9 × 6 would look like this, with the left index finger touching the right little finger:
                                =10==   :right thumb              (top)
                                ==9==   :right index finger       (top)
                                ==8==   :right middle finger      (top)
         left thumb:   =10==    ==7==   :right ring finger        (top)                    
  left index finger:   --9---><---6--   :right little finger      (BOTTOM)  
 left middle finger:   --8--                                      (BOTTOM)
   left ring finger:   --7--                                      (BOTTOM)
 left little finger:   --6--                                      (BOTTOM)

In this example, there are 5 "bottom" fingers (the left index, middle, ring, and little fingers, plus the right little finger), 1 left "top" finger (the left thumb), and 4 right "top" fingers (the right thumb, index finger, middle finger, and ring finger). So the computation goes as follows: 9 × 6 = (10 × 5) + (1 × 4) = 54.

Consider another example, 8 × 7:
                                =10==   :right thumb              (top)
         left thumb:   =10==    ==9==   :right index finger       (top)
  left index finger:   ==9==    ==8==   :right middle finger      (top)
 left middle finger:   --8---><---7--   :right ring finger        (BOTTOM)
   left ring finger:   --7--    --6--   :right little finger      (BOTTOM)
 left little finger:   --6--                                      (BOTTOM)

Five bottom fingers make 5 tens, or 50. Two top left fingers and three top right fingers make the product 6. Summing these produces the answer, 56.

Another example, this time using 6 × 8:

  --8---><---6--
  --7--
  --6--

Four tens (bottom), plus two times four (top) gives 40 + 2 × 4 = 48.

Here's how it works: each finger represents a number between 6 and 10. When one joins fingers representing x and y, there will be 10 - x "top" fingers and x - 5 "bottom" fingers on the left hand; the right hand will have 10 - y "top" fingers and y - 5 "bottom" fingers.

Let
 (the number of "top" fingers on the left hand)
 (the number of "top" fingers on the right hand)
 (the number of "bottom" fingers on the left hand)
 (the number of "bottom" fingers on the right hand)
Then following the above instructions produces

which is the product desired.

Multiplying two numbers close and below 100
This technique allows easy multiplication of numbers close and below 100.(90-99) The variables will be the two numbers one multiplies.

The product of two variables ranging from 90-99 will result in a 4-digit number. The first step is to find the ones-digit and the tens digit.

Subtract both variables from 100 which will result in 2 one-digit number. The product of the 2 one-digit numbers will be the last two digits of one's final product.

Next, subtract one of the two variables from 100. Then subtract the difference from the other variable. That difference will be the first two digits of the final product, and the resulting 4 digit number will be the final product.

Example:
 
           95
         x 97
         ----
 
 Last two digits: 100-95=5 (subtract first number from 100)
                  100-97=3 (subtract second number from 100)
                  5*3=15   (multiply the two differences)
                  Final Product- yx15
 
 First two digits: 100-95=5 (Subtract the first number of the equation from 100)
                   97-5=92  (Subtract that answer from the second number of the equation)
                   Now, the difference will be the first two digits
                   Final Product- 9215
 
 Alternate for first two digits
                   5+3=8    (Add the two single digits derived when calculating "Last two digits" in previous step)
                   100-8=92 (Subtract that answer from 100)
                   Now, the difference will be the first two digits
                   Final Product- 9215

Using square numbers 

The products of small numbers may be calculated by using the squares of integers; for example, to calculate 13 × 17, one can remark 15 is the mean of the two factors, and think of it as (15 − 2) × (15 + 2), i.e. 152 − 22. Knowing that 152 is 225 and 22 is 4, simple subtraction shows that 225 − 4 = 221, which is the desired product.

This method requires knowing by heart a certain number of squares:

Squaring numbers

It may be useful to be aware that the difference between two successive square numbers is the sum of their respective square roots. Hence, if one knows that 12 × 12 = 144 and wish to know 13 × 13, calculate 144 + 12 + 13 = 169.

This is because (x + 1)2 − x2 = x2 + 2x + 1 − x2 = x + (x + 1)

x2 = (x − 1)2 + (2x − 1)

Squaring any number 
Take a given number, and add and subtract a certain value to it that will make it easier to multiply. For example:

 4922

492 is close to 500, which is easy to multiply by. Add and subtract 8 (the difference between 500 and 492) to get

 492 -> 484, 500

Multiply these numbers together to get 242,000 (This can be done efficiently by dividing 484 by 2 = 242 and multiplying by 1000). Finally, add the difference (8) squared (82 = 64) to the result:

 4922 = 242,064

The proof follows:

Squaring any 2-digit integer

This method requires memorization of the squares of the one-digit numbers 1 to 9.

The square of mn, mn being a two-digit integer, can be calculated as

 10 × m(mn + n) + n2

Meaning the square of mn can be found by adding n to mn, multiplied by m, adding 0 to the end and finally adding the square of n.

For example, 232:
 232
 = 10 × 2(23 + 3) + 32
 = 10 × 2(26) + 9
 = 520 + 9
 = 529

So 232 = 529.

Squaring a number ending in 5 
Take the digit(s) that precede the five: abc5, where a, b,  and c are digits
 Multiply this number by itself plus one: abc(abc + 1)
 Take above result and attach 25 to the end
 Example: 85 × 85
 8
 8 × 9 = 72
 So, 852 = 7,225
 Example: 1252
 12
 12 × 13 = 156
 So, 1252 = 15,625
 Mathematical explanation

Squaring numbers very close to 50 

Suppose one needs to square a number n near 50.

The number may be expressed as n = 50 − a so its square is (50−a)2 = 502 − 100a + a2. One knows that 502 is 2500. So one subtracts 100a from 2500, and then add a2.

For example, say one wants to square 48, which is 50 − 2. One subtracts 200 from 2500 and add 4, and get n2 = 2304. For numbers larger than 50 (n = 50 + a), add 100×a instead of subtracting it.

Squaring an integer from 26 to 74

This method requires the memorization of squares from 1 to 24.

The square of n (most easily calculated when n is between 26 and 74 inclusive) is

 (50 − n)2 + 100(n − 25)

In other words, the square of a number is the square of its difference from fifty added to one hundred times the difference of the number and twenty five. For example, to square 62:

 (−12)2 + [(62-25) × 100]
 = 144 + 3,700
 = 3,844

Squaring an integer near 100 (e.g., from 76 to 124)

This method requires the memorization of squares from 1 to a where a is the absolute difference between n and 100.  For example, students who have memorized their squares from 1 to 24 can apply this method to any integer from 76 to 124.

The square of n (i.e., 100 ± a) is

 100(100 ± 2a) + a2

In other words, the square of a number is the square of its difference from 100 added to the product of one hundred and the difference of one hundred and the product of two and the difference of one hundred and the number. For example, to square 93:

 100(100 − 2(7)) + 72
 = 100 × 86 + 49
 = 8,600 + 49
 = 8,649

Another way to look at it would be like this:

 932 = ?      (is −7 from 100)
 93 − 7 = 86  (this gives the first two digits)
 (−7)2 = 49   (these are the second two digits)
 932 = 8649

Another example:
  822 = ?      (is −18 from 100)
  82 − 18 = 64   (subtract.  First digits.)
  (−18)2 = 324 (second pair of digits. One will need to carry the 3.)
  822 = 6724

Squaring any integer near 10n (e.g., 976 to 1024, 9976 to 10024, etc.) 

This method is a straightforward extension of the explanation given above for squaring an integer near 100.
  10122 = ?         (1012 is +12 from 1000)
  (+12)2 = 144      (n trailing digits)
  1012 + 12 = 1024  (leading digits)
  10122 = 1024144

  99972 = ?          (9997 is -3 from 10000)
  (-3)2 = 0009       (n trailing digits)
  9997 - 3 = 9994    (leading digits)
  99972 = 99940009

Squaring any integer near m × 10n (e.g., 276 to 324, 4976 to 5024, 79976 to 80024) 

This method is a straightforward extension of the explanation given above for integers near 10n.
  4072 = ?        (407 is +7 from 400)
  (+7)2 = 49      (n trailing digits)
  407 + 7 = 414
  414 × 4 = 1656  (leading digits; note this multiplication by m wasn't needed for integers from 76 to 124 because their m = 1)
  4072 = 165649

  799912 = ?          (79991 is -9 from 80000)
  (-9)2 = 0081        (n trailing digits)
  79991 - 9
  79982 × 8 = 639856  (leading digits)
  799912 = 6398560081

Finding roots

Approximating square roots 
An easy way to approximate the square root of a number is to use the following equation:

 

The closer the known square is to the unknown, the more accurate the approximation. For instance, to estimate the square root of 15, one could start with the knowledge that the nearest perfect square is 16 (42).

 

So the estimated square root of 15 is 3.875. The actual square root of 15 is 3.872983... One thing to note is that, no matter what the original guess was, the estimated answer will always be larger than the actual answer due to the inequality of arithmetic and geometric means. Thus, one should try rounding the estimated answer down.

Thus, in the previous example, the square root of 15 is  As another example, square root of 41 is  while the actual value is 6.4031...

It may simplify mental calculation to notice that this method is equivalent to the mean of the known square and the unknown square, divided by the known square root:

Derivation

By definition, if r is the square root of x, then

 

One then redefines the root

 

where a is a known root (4 from the above example) and b is the difference between the known root and the answer one seeks.

 

Expanding yields

 

If 'a' is close to the target, 'b' will be a small enough number to render the  element of the equation negligible. Thus, one can drop  out and rearrange the equation to

 

and therefore

 

that can be reduced to

Extracting roots of perfect powers 

Extracting roots of perfect powers is often practiced. The difficulty of the task does not depend on the number of digits of the perfect power but on the precision, i.e. the number of digits of the root. In addition, it also depends on the order of the root; finding perfect roots, where the order of the root is coprime with 10 are somewhat easier since the digits are scrambled in consistent ways, as in the next section.

Extracting cube roots 

An easy task for the beginner is extracting cube roots from the cubes of 2-digit numbers. For example, given 74088, determine what two-digit number, when multiplied by itself once and then multiplied by the number again, yields 74088. One who knows the method will quickly know the answer is 42, as 423 = 74088.

Before learning the procedure, it is required that the performer memorize the cubes of the numbers 1-10:

Observe that there is a pattern in the rightmost digit: adding and subtracting with 1 or 3. Starting from zero: 

03 = 0
13 = 1 up 1
23 = 8 down 3
33 = 27 down 1
43 = 64 down 3
53 = 125 up 1
63 = 216 up 1
73 = 343 down 3
83 = 512 down 1
93 = 729 down 3
103 = 1000 up 1

There are two steps to extracting the cube root from the cube of a two-digit number. For example, extracting the cube root of 29791. Determine the one's place (units) of the two-digit number. Since the cube ends in 1, as seen above, it must be 1.
If the perfect cube ends in 0, the cube root of it must end in 0.
If the perfect cube ends in 1, the cube root of it must end in 1.
If the perfect cube ends in 2, the cube root of it must end in 8.
If the perfect cube ends in 3, the cube root of it must end in 7.
If the perfect cube ends in 4, the cube root of it must end in 4.
If the perfect cube ends in 5, the cube root of it must end in 5.
If the perfect cube ends in 6, the cube root of it must end in 6.
If the perfect cube ends in 7, the cube root of it must end in 3.
If the perfect cube ends in 8, the cube root of it must end in 2.
If the perfect cube ends in 9, the cube root of it must end in 9.

Note that every digit corresponds to itself except for 2, 3, 7 and 8, which are just subtracted from ten to obtain the corresponding digit.

The second step is to determine the first digit of the two-digit cube root by looking at the magnitude of the given cube. To do this, remove the last three digits of the given cube (29791 → 29) and find the greatest cube it is greater than (this is where knowing the cubes of numbers 1-10 is needed). Here, 29 is greater than 1 cubed, greater than 2 cubed, greater than 3 cubed, but not greater than 4 cubed. The greatest cube it is greater than is 3, so the first digit of the two-digit cube must be 3.

Therefore, the cube root of 29791 is 31.

Another example:
Find the cube root of 456533.
The cube root ends in 7.
After the last three digits are taken away, 456 remains.
456 is greater than all the cubes up to 7 cubed.
The first digit of the cube root is 7.
The cube root of 456533 is 77.

This process can be extended to find cube roots that are 3 digits long, by using arithmetic modulo 11.

These types of tricks can be used in any root where the order of the root is coprime with 10; thus it fails to work in square root, since the power, 2, divides into 10. 3 does not divide 10, thus cube roots work.

Approximating common logarithms (log base 10)
To approximate a common logarithm (to at least one decimal point accuracy), a few logarithm rules, and the memorization of a few logarithms is required. One must know:
log(a × b) = log(a) + log(b)
log(a / b) = log(a) - log(b)
log(0) does not exist
log(1) = 0
log(2) ~ .30
log(3) ~ .48
log(7) ~ .85

From this information, one can find the logarithm of any number 1-9.
log(1) = 0
log(2) ~ .30
log(3) ~ .48
log(4) = log(2 × 2) = log(2) + log(2) ~ .60
log(5) = log(10 / 2) = log(10) − log(2) ~ .70
log(6) = log(2 × 3) = log(2) + log(3) ~ .78
log(7) ~ .85
log(8) = log(2 × 2 × 2) = log(2) + log(2) + log(2) ~ .90
log(9) = log(3 × 3) = log(3) + log(3) ~ .96
log(10) = 1 + log(1) = 1

The first step in approximating the common logarithm is to put the number given in scientific notation. For example, the number 45 in scientific notation is 4.5 × 101, but one will call it a × 10b. Next, find the logarithm of a, which is between 1 and 10. Start by finding the logarithm of 4, which is .60, and then the logarithm of 5, which is .70 because 4.5 is between these two. Next, and skill at this comes with practice, place a 5 on a logarithmic scale between .6 and .7, somewhere around .653 (NOTE: the actual value of the extra places will always be greater than if it were placed on a regular scale. i.e., one would expect it to go at .650 because it is halfway, but instead, it will be a little larger, in this case, .653) Once one has obtained the logarithm of a, simply add b to it to get the approximation of the common logarithm. In this case, a + b = .653 + 1 = 1.653. The actual value of log(45) ~ 1.65321.

The same process applies for numbers between 0 and 1. For example, 0.045 would be written as 4.5 × 10−2. The only difference is that b is now negative, so when adding one is really subtracting. This would yield the result 0.653 − 2, or −1.347.

Mental arithmetic as a psychological skill
Physical exertion of the proper level can lead to an increase in performance of a mental task, like doing mental calculations, performed afterward. It has been shown that during high levels of physical activity there is a negative effect on mental task performance. This means that too much physical work can decrease accuracy and output of mental math calculations. Physiological measures, specifically EEG, have been shown to be useful in indicating mental workload. Using an EEG as a measure of mental workload after different levels of physical activity can help determine the level of physical exertion that will be the most beneficial to mental performance. Previous work done at Michigan Technological University by Ranjana Mehta includes a recent study that involved participants engaging in concurrent mental and physical tasks. This study investigated the effects of mental demands on physical performance at different levels of physical exertion and ultimately found a decrease in physical performance when mental tasks were completed concurrently, with a more significant effect at the higher level of physical workload. The Brown-Peterson procedure is a widely known task using mental arithmetic. This procedure, mostly used in cognitive experiments, suggests mental subtraction is useful in testing the effects maintenance rehearsal can have on how long short-term memory lasts.

Mental Calculations World Championship 
The first Mental Calculations World Championship took place in 1997. This event repeats every year. It consists of a range of different tasks such as addition of ten ten-digit numbers, multiplication of two eight-digit numbers, calculation of square roots, calculation of weekdays for given dates, calculation of cube roots, and some surprise miscellaneous tasks.

Mental Calculation World Cup 

The first World Mental Calculation Championships (Mental Calculation World Cup) took place in 2004. They are repeated every second year. It consists of six different tasks: addition of ten ten-digit numbers, multiplication of two eight-digit numbers, calculation of square roots, and calculation of weekdays for given dates, calculation of cube roots plus some surprise miscellaneous tasks.

Memoriad – World Memory, Mental Calculation & Speed Reading Olympics 
Memoriad is the first platform combining "mental calculation", "memory" and "photographic reading" competitions. Games and competitions are held in the year of the Olympic games, every four years.

The first international Memoriad was held in Istanbul, Turkey, in 2008.
The second Memoriad took place in Antalya, Turkey on 24–25 November 2012. 89 competitors from 20 countries participated. Awards and money prizes were given for 10 categories in total; of which 5 categories had to do about Mental Calculation (Mental addition, Mental Multiplication, Mental Square Roots (non-integer), Mental Calendar Dates calculation and Flash Anzan).

See also 
Doomsday rule for calculating the day of the week
Mental abacus
Mental calculator
Miksike MentalMath
Soroban

References

External links
Mental Calculation World Cup
Memoriad - World Mental Olympics

 
Games of mental skill